First-seeded Bob Bryan and Mike Bryan defeated seventh-seeded Martin Damm and Leander Paes 4–6, 6–3, 6–4 to win the men's doubles title at the 2006 Australian Open.

Seeds

Draw

Finals

Top half

Section 1

Section 2

Bottom half

Section 3

Section 4

External links
 2006 Australian Open – Men's draws and results at the International Tennis Federation

Men's Doubles
Australian Open (tennis) by year – Men's doubles